The Curse of the Aztec Mummy (Spanish: La Maldición de la Momia Azteca) is a 1957 Mexican horror film directed by Rafael Portillo. It is the second film in the Aztec Mummy series which began with The Aztec Mummy (Spanish title:La Momia Azteca) which was released earlier that year.

Plot

The plot is continued from the first film in the series, The Aztec Mummy. The evil Dr. Krupp (Luis Aceves Castañeda) escapes from the police with the aid of his gang. He once again tries to get possession of the Aztec princess Xochitl's gold breastplate and bracelet by hypnotizing her current reincarnation, Flor Sepulveda, to get her to reveal the location of Xochitl's tomb.

Confusion reigns as Krupp and his thugs are opposed by Flor's fiancé Dr. Almada, his mild-mannered assistant Pinacate, and a mysterious masked superhero called the Angel. It turns out their bookish friend Pinacate has been the man behind the Angel's mask. Dr. Krupp kidnaps Flor, Dr. Almada, and the Angel and tries to force Almada to translate the hieroglyphics on the breastplate, which will reveal the secret location of the Aztec treasure.

However, he finally meets his match when Popoca, the warrior mummy who guards Xochitl's tomb, bursts into the mad doctor's lab, kills his thugs and throws the screaming Dr. Krupp into a pit filled with live snakes. Popoca takes his stolen artifacts and stumbles off back to his tomb. Flor and Dr. Almada go off to get married. This film's plot leads into the third film in the trilogy, The Robot vs. The Aztec Mummy.

Cast 
Ramón Gay as Dr. Eduardo Almada
Rosa Arenas as Flor Sepulveda / Xochitl
Crox Alvarado as Pinacate / El Ángel
Luis Aceves Castañeda as Dr. Krupp (a.k.a. El Murciélago/the Bat)
Jorge Mondragón as Dr. Sepúlveda
Arturo Martínez as Henchman Tierno
Emma Roldán as María, Dr. Almada's housekeeper
Julián de Meriche as the Commandante de Policía
Salvador Lozano
Jaime González Quiñones as Pepe Almada
Ángel di Stefani as Popoca the Aztec Mummy
Jesús Murcielago Velázquez as El Murciélago (the Bat)
Enrique Yáñez as Esbirro del Murciélago
Guillermo Hernández as Esbirro del Murciélago
Alberto Yáñez as Esbirro del Murciélago
Firpo Segura as Esbirro del Murciélago
Sergio Yañez as Esbirro del Murciélago
Estela Inda as Aztec Chanteuse

Release
The Curse of the Aztec Mummy was released theatrically in 1957. It was later dubbed in English and released in the U.S. by K. Gordon Murray.

Reception
Author and film critic Leonard Maltin awarded the film one and a half out of four stars, calling it "Cheap" and "droning".
On his website Fantastic Movie Musings and Ramblings, Dave Sindelar noted that the film was slightly better than its sequel, having more plot than the other films in the series. Sindelar's only criticism was slow pacing during the last half of the film. TV Guide awarded the film three out of four stars, calling it "wholly enjoyable".

Horror DVDs.com on their review for the complete series gave the film a negative review calling it "the least satisfying entry in the series". The reviewer also criticized the introduction of the superhero El Ángel as "random".

Other films in the Aztec Mummy series
 The Aztec Mummy (1957), released as Attack of the Mayan Mummy in the U.S.
 The Robot vs. the Aztec Mummy (1957)
 The Wrestling Women vs. the Aztec Mummy (1964), featured a similar Aztec mummy named Tezomoc
 Mil Mascaras vs. the Aztec Mummy (2007)

References

External links 

La maldición de la momia azteca  at DB Cult Film Institute

1957 films
1950s Spanish-language films
Mexican black-and-white films
Mexican monster movies
1957 horror films
Mummy films
1950s Mexican films